Strikethrough is a typographical presentation of words with a horizontal line through their center, resulting in text like this. Contrary to censored or sanitized (redacted) texts, the words remain readable. This presentation signifies one of two meanings. In ink-written, typewritten, or other non-erasable text, the words are a mistake and not meant for inclusion. When used on a computer screen, however, it indicates deleted information, as popularized by Microsoft Word's revision and track changes features. It can also be used deliberately to imply a change of thought (as in epanorthosis).

Uses

Marking errors 
Strikethrough is primarily used to mark text that is mistaken or to be removed. Historically, this has also been marked by placing dots under the letters to be ignored.

Physics 

In quantum field theory, a slash through a symbol, such as ⱥ, is shorthand for γμaμ, where a is a covariant four-vector, the γμ are the gamma matrices, and the repeated index μ is summed over according to the Einstein notation.

Highlighting 
In medieval manuscripts such as the Domesday Book, "strikethrough" of text with red ink often functions as highlighting similar to modern underline.

Computer representations

HTML 
The HTML presentational inline element for strikethrough is <strike> or <s> This element was, however, deprecated in the 1999 HTML 4.01 standard, and replaced by the <del> tag, a semantic element representing deleted text, which user agents (typically web browsers) often render as a strikethrough.

In the HTML5 draft, there is no presentational element for strikethrough. However, there are two related semantic elements. Firstly, <s>, that is strikethrough in HTML 3 and 4, is redefined to mark text that is no longer correct, and secondly, <del> marks text that has been deleted, as it does in HTML 4.01.

Other markup symbols 
 BB Code is a markup language used on many web forums. The BB Code for strikethrough is [s] or [strike].
 GitHub flavored Markdown uses double tilde ~~ to wrap around text for strikethrough.
 Gmail chat uses minus sign - to wrap around text for strikethrough.

CSS 
In cascading style sheets (CSS) strikethrough is controlled using the text-decoration property, and specified by the line-through value of that property. For example, <span style="text-decoration: line-through;">ABCD efghi</span> renders like this: ABCD efghi

To maintain backwards compatibility, the following can be added to the CSS: strike {text-decoration:line-through;}  The example above could then be written like this: <strike>ABCD efghi</strike>, which is compatible with HTML 4. In HTML 5, this: <del>ABCD efghi</del> also produces the same result, although the use of CSS is preferred and the del tag carries a semantic interpretation not present in the purely stylistic s and strike tags.

Unicode

Combining characters 
In plain text scenarios where markup cannot be used, Unicode offers a number of combining characters that achieve similar effects.

The "combining long stroke overlay" (U+0336) results in an unbroken stroke across the text:
 A̶B̶C̶D̶ ̶e̶f̶g̶h̶i̶
while the "combining short stroke overlay" (U+0335) results in individually struck out characters:
 A̵B̵C̵D̵ ̵e̵f̵g̵h̵i̵
Similarly, the "combining short solidus overlay" (U+0337) results in diagonally struck out letters:
 A̷B̷C̷D̷ ̷e̷f̷g̷h̷i̷
as does the "combining long solidus overlay" (U+0338), which produces longer diagonal strokes:
 A̸B̸C̸D̸ ̸e̸f̸g̸h̸i̸

Specific struck-through characters 
A number of characters that have the visual appearance of struck-through characters exist in Unicode, including ƀ, Đđ, Ððᶞ, Ǥǥ, Ħħꟸ𐞕, Ɨɨᵻᶤᶧ, Ɉɉ, Łłᴌ, Ɵɵ, ꝵꝶ, Ŧ, Ʉʉᵾᶶ, Ƶ, ƻ, ʡ𐞳, ʢ𐞴, Ғғ, Ҟҟ,  Ұұ, Ҍҍ. These usually have specific functions (for example, in the Latin Extended-A character set) or representations and are not intended for general use. However, they are not precomposed characters and have neither canonical nor compatibility decompositions. This issue has created security considerations since "precomposed" characters like U+019F and sequences like U+004F U+0335 or U+004F U+0336 often cause visual confusion (compare Ɵ, O̵ and O̶). Unicode has acknowledged this issue and has proposed a standardized method for counteraction.

For slashed letters in an orthography, unitary letters are provided by Unicode. The diacritics are used in generic applications, such as math operators which systematically use the solidus overlay to indicate negation.

Double/multiple strikethrough 
Double strikethrough is an option in certain word processing applications such as Microsoft Word. There is no generally agreed meaning of double strikethrough, but it may be used as a second level of single strikethrough.

In Japan, double strikethrough is conventionally used (rather than single strikethrough) when striking out text. This is for added clarity, as in complex kanji a single strikethrough may be missed or confused with a stroke in the character.

Double, triple or multiple strikethrough may also (especially formerly) be used as a way of emphasising words.

Research 
Since at least 2014, researchers in the area of optical character recognition have attempted to solve the problem of recognizing struck-out text in handwritten documents.

See also 
Bar (diacritic)

References 

Typography